Acalypha eggersii is a species of plant in the family Euphorbiaceae. It is endemic to Ecuador.  Its natural habitat is subtropical or tropical dry forests.

References

Sources
 

Flora of Ecuador
eggersii
Critically endangered plants
Taxonomy articles created by Polbot